Pandalam Suspension Bridge is a pedestrian suspension bridge which crosses the Achankovil River in the state of Kerala, India. It connects Ayyappa Temple with Kaippuzha Sreekrishna Temple.

It is the widest suspension bridge in Kerala.

References

Bridges in Kerala